Mauricio Ricardo Pinilla Ferrera (born 4 February 1984) is a Chilean former professional footballer who played as a striker.

After beginning his career at Universidad de Chile, he signed for Inter Milan at the age of 19, but never appeared for the club in four years. He went on to play in five countries, mainly Italy.

A Chile international since 2003, Pinilla represented the country at the 2014 World Cup and two Copa América, winning the 2015 and 2016 editions of the latter tournament.

Club career

Early career
Born in Santiago, Pinilla started his career with Club Universidad de Chile, leaving for European football and Italian giants Inter Milan in 2003 after signing a five-year contract.

However, he was immediately sold to fellow Serie A club A.C. ChievoVerona (which acquired 50% of the player's rights), and finished the 2003–04 season on loan again, to La Liga side RC Celta de Vigo, not managing to score in a total of 12 league appearances.

Journeyman
In July 2004, Sporting CP bought 50% of his playing rights and Pinilla, having spent much of the season on a low note, finished it with five goals, notably a hat-trick in a 3–0 away win against S.C. Braga on 1 May 2005.

However, he was also unable to settle at Sporting and, in January 2006, would move on loan, finishing the campaign at Racing de Santander. On 26 February 2006 he netted his only goal for the Cantabria team, a penalty kick in a 2–2 draw at Deportivo Alavés.

In 2006–07, Pinilla was once again loaned, now to Heart of Midlothian. His time with the Edinburgh club was beset by injuries, resulting in him only playing a handful of times for the first team; in February 2007, he returned to Universidad de Chile.

Pinilla returned to Hearts for pre-season training ahead of the 2007–08 season, with Hearts buying out Sporting's half of his rights. However, his return to playing football with Hearts had a major setback when it was revealed the player had a fractured scaphoid wrist bone, a hidden injury sustained while still in Chile; this put him out of action for a six further weeks.

On 9 January 2008, it was reported that Pinilla had sustained another injury in training that sidelined him for the rest of the campaign. On 6 May, his agent stated that he had signed a deal which would keep him at Tynecastle Park until 2011, after his contract with Inter expired the following month. However, on 1 July, Hearts announced that they had released the forward.

Pinilla joined Brazil's CR Vasco da Gama in early September 2008, signing a contract until the end of the season. He played his first match with his new club in a 0–1 home defeat to CR Flamengo, in a derby.

After Vasco was relegated to the Série B, Pinilla left and moved to Cyprus' Apollon Limassol FC as a free agent.

Back to Italy and Serie A
Pinilla returned to Italy in August 2009, joining Serie B's F.C. Grosseto S.S.D. on a free transfer. At the Tuscan club, his once promising career got back on track, as he scored 24 goals in 24 games – including a series of 12 consecutive matches netting, a competition record– and finished the campaign as the second best scorer despite missing more than a third of the fixtures through different injuries.

In June 2010, U.S. Città di Palermo announced the signing of Pinilla. He scored five league goals in his first 12 appearances, being an important attacking unit in a side that also included Abel Hernández, Massimo Maccarone and Fabrizio Miccoli.

On 11 September 2011, in the season's opener, Pinilla was brought from the bench to score the 4–2 for Palermo against his former team Inter, in an eventual 4–3 home win. On 25 January of the following year he was loaned to Cagliari Calcio in the same league, with the Sardinians having the option of making the move permanent in June.

Pinilla joined Cagliari on a permanent basis on 2 July 2012. Two years later, after an average of seven league goals per season, he moved to Genoa C.F.C. on a 2+1 years deal.

Whilst at the service of Atalanta BC, on loan, Pinilla scored arguably one of the best goals of the season in Italy on 4 April 2015, after netting through a bicycle kick in a 1–2 home loss to Torino FC. He added a further five during his five-month tenure, being crucial as his team narrowly avoided relegation as 17th.

On 5 January 2017, Pinilla returned to Genoa on a loan with an obligation to buy, replacing Leonardo Pavoletti who left for S.S.C. Napoli.

Return to Universidad
On 21 July 2017, aged 33 and ten years after last leaving the club, Pinilla terminated his contract with Genoa and returned to Universidad de Chile. He retired in February 2021, following a two-year spell at Coquimbo Unido who were relegated from the Chilean Primera División at the end of the 2020 season.

International career
Pinilla earned the first of his 45 caps for Chile on 30 March 2003 in a friendly against Peru, closing a 2–0 win through a header, and later led his country's scoring in the 2006 FIFA World Cup qualifiers with three goals. However, on 27 February 2007, whilst on loan to Universidad de Chile, he was caught in a hotel with María José López, the model wife of national team captain Luis Antonio Jiménez.

Subsequently, Pinilla announced his decision to retire from the international scene. In August 2010 he returned to the team, being recalled by manager Marcelo Bielsa for an exhibition game with Ukraine. He was also picked for a match against Uruguay later in November of the following year, only to be called off due to injury.

Pinilla was selected for the 2014 World Cup in Brazil. He made his debut in the tournament on 14 June, playing two minutes in a 3–1 group stage victory over Australia and being involved in Jean Beausejour's goal. Again from the bench, he appeared in the round-of-16 against the hosts: his 119th minute shot hit the bar with the score at 1–1, and he later missed his penalty shootout attempt in an eventual elimination.

Pinilla was a member of the squad which won the 2015 Copa América on home soil for their first continental honour, contributing two late substitute appearances. On 29 March 2016, he and Arturo Vidal scored twice each in a 4–1 away defeat of Venezuela in qualification for the 2018 World Cup.

Post-retirement
In March 2021, Pinilla joined ESPN Chile as a commentator and analyst along with fellow former footballer Marcelo Espina. That same year, he moved to Televisión Nacional de Chile as host of non-football shows.

Personal life
Pinilla's nephew, Felipe Miranda, played youth football with Colo-Colo, being at that point followed by Palermo.

Career statistics

Club

International

International goals

Honours
Chile
Copa América: 2015, 2016

References

External links

1984 births
Living people
Chilean people of Italian descent
Chilean footballers
Footballers from Santiago
Association football forwards
Chilean Primera División players
Universidad de Chile footballers
Coquimbo Unido footballers
Serie A players
Serie B players
Inter Milan players
A.C. ChievoVerona players
F.C. Grosseto S.S.D. players
Palermo F.C. players
Cagliari Calcio players
Genoa C.F.C. players
Atalanta B.C. players
La Liga players
RC Celta de Vigo players
Racing de Santander players
Primeira Liga players
Sporting CP footballers
Scottish Premier League players
Heart of Midlothian F.C. players
Campeonato Brasileiro Série A players
CR Vasco da Gama players
Cypriot First Division players
Apollon Limassol FC players
Chile under-20 international footballers
Chile international footballers
2014 FIFA World Cup players
2015 Copa América players
Copa América Centenario players
Copa América-winning players
Chilean expatriate footballers
Expatriate footballers in Italy
Expatriate footballers in Spain
Expatriate footballers in Portugal
Expatriate footballers in Scotland
Expatriate footballers in Brazil
Expatriate footballers in Cyprus
Chilean expatriate sportspeople in Italy
Chilean expatriate sportspeople in Spain
Chilean expatriate sportspeople in Portugal
Chilean expatriate sportspeople in Scotland
Chilean expatriate sportspeople in Brazil
Chilean expatriate sportspeople in Cyprus
Chilean association football commentators
Chilean television personalities